is a Japanese manga series written and illustrated by Shin Takahashi. It was serialized in Shogakukan's seinen manga magazine Weekly Big Comic Spirits from January 2016 to September 2018.

Publication
Written and illustrated by Shin Takahashi, Kanata-Kakeru was serialized in Shogakukan's seinen manga magazine Weekly Big Comic Spirits from January 4, 2016, to September 3, 2018. Shogakukan collected its chapters in five tankōbon volumes, released from March 30, 2016, to October 30, 2018.

Volume list

References

External links
  
 

Seinen manga
Shogakukan manga
Sports anime and manga